Geoglossum difforme is a species of earth tongue fungus in the family Geoglossaceae. It is found in Europe and North America. It is listed as critically endangered in Denmark and endangered in Sweden. It is inedible.

References

External links

Geoglossaceae
Fungi described in 1815
Fungi of Europe
Fungi of North America
Inedible fungi